Life After Manson is a 2014 documentary film, and is based on the story of Manson Family member Patricia Krenwinkel, who was involved in the infamous Tate-LaBianca murders in 1969. In the documentary Krenwinkel discusses her childhood, her life with the family, and her life in prison. The film premiered at the 2014 Tribeca Film Festival.

References

External links
 
 

2014 films
2014 documentary films
American documentary films
Manson Family
2010s English-language films
2010s American films